This is a list of notable Batak people.

Academicians and Educators
 Amany Lubis, rector Syarif Hidayatullah State Islamic University
 Bakri Siregar, teacher, lecturer, and writer
 Harun Nasution, Islamic thought
 Lafran Pane, academician and Indonesian national hero
 Likas Tarigan, teacher and politician
 Melanchton Siregar, teacher and politician
 Pantur Silaban, lecturer and physicist
 Willem Iskander or Sati Nasution, teacher, founded Kweekschool Voor inlandsche onderwijzer in 1862 in Tano Bato, Mandailing Natal Regency.

Architects
 Friedrich Silaban, designed the Istiqlal Mosque and Gelora Bung Karno Stadium among others.

Athletes
 Akbar, football player
 Alamsyah Nasution, football player 
 Alvin Abdul Halim, football player 
 Ansyari Lubis, football player
 Anthony Sinisuka Ginting, badminton player
 Elsa Manora Nasution, swimmer
 Ferdinand Sinaga, football player
 Habib Nasution, swimmer
 Jesse Hutagalung, Dutch tennis player
 Mahyadi Panggabean, football player
 Muhammad Akbar Nasution, swimmer
 Radja Nainggolan, Belgian footballer
 Riko Simanjuntak, football player
 Rizky Yusuf Nasution, football player
 Saktiawan Sinaga, football player
 Samuel Christianson Simanjuntak, football player
 Sorie Enda Nasution, weightlifter
 Zakaria Nasution, swimmer

Attorneys
 Adnan Buyung Nasution
 Hotman Paris Hutapea
 Ruhut Sitompul
 Tommy Sihotang
 Todung Mulya Lubis

Authors
 Armijn Pane
 Dewi Lestari
 Iwan Simatupang 
 Mochtar Lubis
 Merari Siregar, author of the first novel written in Indonesian.
 Muhammad Kasim Dalimunte, author of the first short story collection in the Indonesian literary canon. 
 Soeman Hasiboean, author of first detective novel in Indonesian.
 Sitor Situmorang

Businesspeople
 Manampin Girsang

Economists
 Arifin Siregar, governor of Indonesian central bank, Bank of Indonesia 
 Darmin Nasution, governor of Indonesian central bank, Bank of Indonesia

Entertainers 
 Ahmad Zulkifli Lubis, actor
 Amir Pasaribu, pianist, composer and critic
 Anneth Delliecia, singer-songwriter
 Atiqah Hasiholan, model and actress
 Bill Saragih, jazz musician
 Cas Alfonso, singer-songwriter
 Charles Bonar Sirait, television presenter
 Diana Nasution, singer
 Fatin Shidqia, singer
 Gloria Jessica, singer
 Joy Destiny Tobing, singer
 Judika, singer
 Lyodra Ginting, singer
 Nadya Hutagalung, actress
 Novita Dewi, singer
 Prisia Nasution, martial artist
 Putri Ayu Silaen, singer
 Sari Simorangkir, singer
 Sharena, model and actress
 Umar Lubis, actor
 Wafda Saifan, singer
 Zivanna Letisha Siregar, model

Historical figures
 Sisingamangaraja XII, the last Batak priest-king and a National Hero of Indonesia

Journalists
 Mochtar Lubis, journalist, writer
 Putra Nababan, journalist, news presenter, politician
 Rosianna Silalahi, journalist, news presenter
 Sanusi Pane, journalist, writer

Military
 Abdul Haris Nasution, five-star general, leader of Indonesian army forces
 Feisal Tanjung, leader of Indonesian army forces
 Maraden Panggabean, leader of Indonesian army forces
 T.B. Simatupang, leader of Indonesian army forces
 Donald Izacus Panjaitan, Indonesian revolutionary hero
 Zulkifli Lubis, first chairman of Intelligence Agency in Indonesia

Politicians
 Abdul Rasjid, Volksraad member and physician
 Adam Malik, former Indonesian vice president and 26th President of the United Nations General Assembly
 Akhyar Nasution, former mayor of Medan
 Amir Sjarifuddin, former Indonesian prime minister
 Bobby Nasution, mayor of Medan
 Burhanuddin Harahap, former Indonesian prime minister
 Oloan Hutapea, briefly head of the Communist Party (PKI)
 Ferdinand Lumbantobing, former Indonesian minister of Manpower and Transmigration
 Kaharuddin Nasution, governor of Riau
 Malam Sambat Kaban, Indonesian government minister
 Mangaradja Soeangkoepon, Volksraad member
 Raja Inal Siregar, former North Sumatera Province Governor
 Sabam Sirait, member of the People's Representative Council
 Sutan Mohammad Amin Nasution, governor of North Sumatra and Riau 
 Lintong Mulia Sitorus, writer and general secretary of Socialist Party of Indonesia
 Luhut Binsar Pandjaitan, Indonesian minister
 Saifuddin Nasution Ismail, a member of the Malaysian Parliament and People's Justice Party
 Zainul Arifin, former Deputy Prime Minister of Indonesia

Religious leaders
 Alfred Gonti Pius Datubara, Roman Catholic Archbishop of Medan
 Anicetus Bongsu Antonius Sinaga, Roman Catholic Archbishop of Medan
 Martinus Dogma Situmorang, Roman Catholic Bishop of Padang
 Ludovikus Simanullang, Roman Catholic Bishop of Sibolga
 Darwin Lumbantobing, 16th Ephorus of the Batak Christian Protestant Church
 Ramlan Hutahaean, 9th General Secretary of the Batak Christian Protestant Church
 S.A.E. Nababan, Lutheran theologian, Ephorus of the Batak Christian Protestant Church
 Sholeh Mahmoed Nasution, Islamic preacher

Visual artists
 Dolorosa Sinaga, sculptor

See also
Batak
North Sumatera
List of Acehnese people
List of Bugis people
List of Chinese Indonesians
List of Javanese
List of Minangkabau people
List of Moluccan people
List of Sundanese people

References

Sources
 

Batak
Batak